Horace J. Hawkins was a British socialist.

Hawkins was secretary of the Stratford (later Central West Ham) branch of the Social Democratic Federation from 1900 to 1903 and a speaker for that party.  He proved to be important in the formation of the Socialist Party of Great Britain, being expelled, along with Jack Fitzgerald, at the Burnley conference of the SDF in April 1904, and serving on the SPGB Provisional Committee of May 1904. He was also on the first Executive Committee and was an outdoor speaker for the SPGB.  Hawkins was expelled on 4 February 1905 for his personal harassment of Alexander Anderson.

By 1910 Hawkins was in Australia and active as a De Leonist. He is last known of a year later as a member of the IWW Club in Sydney.

References

See also
Socialist Party of Great Britain 1904–1913 membership register
Justice

Socialist Party of Great Britain members
Social Democratic Federation members
19th-century births
20th-century deaths
Industrial Workers of the World members